is a district in Chiyoda, Tokyo, Japan. As of March 1, 2008, its population is 1,277.

Located in the northern part of Chiyoda, the Uchi-Kanda district borders Kanda-Mitoshirochō, Kanda-Tsukasamachi, Kanda-Tachō and Kanda-Kajichō to the north, Kajichō to the east, Nihonbashi-Hongokuchō, Chūō to the southeast,  Ōtemachi to the south, and Kanda-Nishikichō to the west.

Today, Uchi-Kanda is a commercial neighborhood with a number of office buildings and stores.

The Japanese division of American Megatrends has its offices in Uchi-Kanda.

Education
 operates public elementary and junior high schools. Chiyoda Elementary School (千代田小学校) is the zoned elementary school for Uchi-Kanda 1-3 chōme. There is a freedom of choice system for junior high schools in Chiyoda Ward, and so there are no specific junior high school zones.

References

Districts of Chiyoda, Tokyo
Kanda, Tokyo